Hector's Bunyip, is a 1986 Australian TV movie about a young boy who is abducted by a bunyip.

It was shot in the lower Hunter Valley.

It was aired on WonderWorks.

References

External links

Hector's Bunyip at Peter Malone's website
Hector's Bunyip at AustLit

Australian television films
1986 television films
1986 films
1980s English-language films